There and Back is a 2000 live album by Skydiggers.

Most tracks were recorded at Toronto's Horseshoe Tavern on December 18, 1999. Tracks 2, 5 and 7 were recorded at the Sidetrack Café in Edmonton in 1998.

The final track, "Will You Ride Wide Open", is a new studio song. Additionally, the songs "Biloxi" (originally written and recorded by Jesse Winchester) and "Those Memories", although recorded live, have never appeared on a previous Skydiggers album.

Track listing
 "Slow Burnin' Fire"  – 5:16 (J.Buckingham)
 "Just Over This Mountain"  – 5:25 (Finlayson/Maize)
 "Feel You Closer"  – 2:12 (P.Cash)
 "Alice Graham"  – 3:55 (Finlayson/Maize)
 "Radio Waves"  – 3:16 (P.Cash/Chambers/Finlayson/Macey/Maize/von Athen)
 "Dear Henry"  – 4:22 (Finlayson/Maize)
 "I Will Give You Everything"  – 4:34 (Finlayson/Maize)
 "Swamp Boogie"  – 3:24 (P.Cash)
 "Truth About Us"  – 5:55 (S.Garbe)
 "You've Got That Look In Your Eye"  – 3:41 (P.Cash)
 "Just Before the Rain"  – 3:02 (P.Cash)
 "Monday Morning"  – 6:11 (P.Cash/Finlayson/Macey/Maize/Stokes)
 "A Penny More"  – 7:22 (Finlayson/Maize)
 "Biloxi"  – 4:53 (J.Winchester)
 "Those Memories"  – 0:37 (Traditional)
 "Will You Ride Wide Open"  – 3:30 (Tariq/Maize)

References

Skydiggers albums
2000 live albums
Albums recorded at the Horseshoe Tavern